Browland is a village on Mainland in Shetland, Scotland situated about  east north east of Walls. Browland is within the parish of Sandsting.

References

External links

Canmore - Browland site record

Villages in Mainland, Shetland